Louis Gürtler (born 22 May 1877) was a Swiss footballer who played in the 1890s as midfielder.

Football career
FC Basel was founded on 15 November 1893 and Gürtler joined the club about three years later, during their 1896–97 season. Gürtler played his first game for the club in the away game on 22 November 1896 as Basel were hosted by French team FC Mulhouse. Mulhouse got the better end and won 3–2.

Gürtler stayed with the club for three seasons and during this time he played 13 games for Basel without scoring a goal.

The last game that he played for Basel was on 23 October 1898 as Basel won 5–1 against FC Bern. That morning, Bern had also played a game against the FCB second team, which they won 6–2, this was match in the "Coupe Ruinart" (Serie B championship), the second tier of the Swiss championships.

Notes

Footnotes

References

Sources
 Rotblau: Jahrbuch Saison 2017/2018. Publisher: FC Basel Marketing AG. 
 Die ersten 125 Jahre. Publisher: Josef Zindel im Friedrich Reinhardt Verlag, Basel. 
 Verein "Basler Fussballarchiv" Homepage
(NB: Despite all efforts, the editors of these books and the authors in "Basler Fussballarchiv" have failed to be able to identify all the players, their date and place of birth or date and place of death, who played in the games during the early years of FC Basel)

FC Basel players
Swiss men's footballers
Association football midfielders
1870s births
Date of death missing